Kevin Sharp (born 6 April 1959) is an English cricket coach and a former first-class cricketer. He was educated at Abbey Grange High School in Leeds.

Sharp succeeded the long-serving Steve Rhodes as Worcestershire Head Coach in 2018.

He had a fourteen-year first-class career playing for Yorkshire County Cricket Club and Griqualand West cricket team. He was a left-handed batsman and bowled right-arm off-spin.

Unlike his contemporary David Gower, this curly haired left-handed batsman failed to do justice to his talent, and did not win the England cap predicted, after he scored 260* for England Young Cricketers in 1978.

Sharp made his first-class debut for Yorkshire County Cricket Club in 1976, and was awarded his cap in 1982. As well as Yorkshire, he spent three seasons with Griqualand West in South Africa between 1981 and 1984, playing seventeen first-class matches, and averaging just under 40.

After finishing his Yorkshire first-class career in 1990, Sharp played for Shropshire in the Minor Counties from 1993 to 1997, while playing club cricket for Bridgnorth, and Ossett in Yorkshire.

After retiring from the game he has worked as a batting coach for Yorkshire, and as an umpire. He was appointed as Head Coach of Worcestershire on 12 January 2018.

References

External links

1959 births
Living people
Cricketers from Leeds
English cricket coaches
English cricketers
Griqualand West cricketers
Marylebone Cricket Club cricketers
Minor Counties cricketers
Shropshire cricketers
Yorkshire cricketers
D. B. Close's XI cricketers
D. H. Robins' XI cricketers
Young England cricketers